Mount Adam may refer to:

 Mount Adam, Sri Lanka
 Mount Adam (Antarctica)
 Mount Adam (British Columbia)
 Mount Adam, Falkland Islands

See also
Mount Adams (disambiguation)